Ascothoracida is a small group of crustaceans, comprising around 100 species. They are found throughout the world, and are parasites on cnidarians and echinoderms.

Ascothoracida was previously ranked as an order within the infraclass Cirripedia (barnacles), but now both Ascothoracida and Cirripedia are considered separate subclasses. Those two subclasses, along with Facetotecta, make up the class Thecostraca.

The thorax of Ascothoracida species has six pair of biramous appendages, while the abdomen has four segments and a terminal telson with a caudal furca. This arrangement is similar to that seen in copepods. In addition, there is a bivalved carapace, which is expanded in females.

References

External links

Maxillopoda